Kemaluddin Al-Haj was a politician and teacher from Brunei who previously served as the Speaker of the Legislative Council and the head of the Department of Religious Affairs. He is the founder of several Arabic schools. The institutions included the Seri Begawan Religious Teachers College, the Raja Isteri Pengiran Anak Damit Girls' Secondary Arabic Religious School, and the Hassanal Bolkiah Boys' Arabic Secondary School.

Career 
On 1 September 1962, he was appointed as the head of the Department of Religious Affairs. He would be replaced by Zain Serudin in 1970. A Religious Affairs Department sponsored movie, Gema Dari Menara, was directed by and filmed at the residence of then Paduka Anak Kemaluddin. He was chosen as the Speaker of the Legislative Council twice from 12 December 1981 until the council's abolishment on 13 February 1984, and the reestablishment on 25 September 2004, he was selected as the Speaker of the Legislative Council, before being replaced by Isa Ibrahim on 1 March 2011.

Death 
Kemaluddin died on 9 January 2012. The State Mufti, Abdul Aziz Juned conducted the funeral prayer, which was performed by Sultan Hassanal Bolkiah and others. In a designated vehicle, the body was transported to the Kubah Makam Di Raja for burial.

Personal life 
Married to Pengiran Anak Datin Paduka Hajah Siti Rafiah, and they had six kids; three sons and three daughters.  

 Pengiran Anak Haji 'Abdul Rahim, married to Princess Rashidah in 1996.  
 Pengiran Anak Haji Muhammad Bey Muntassir (1956–2009), married to Princess Amal Jefriah .in 1980

Honours 
Pengiran Anak Kemaluddin Al-Haj has earned the Sultan Haji Omar 'Ali Saifuddien Education Award (APSHOAS) in commemoration to 2011 Teachers' Day. He holds the title of Yang Amat Mulia Pengiran Indera Mahkota Pengiran Anak and earned the following honours;
  Order of Seri Paduka Mahkota Brunei First Class (SPMB) – Dato Seri Paduka
  Order of Paduka Seri Laila Jasa First Class (PSLJ)  – Dato Paduka Seri Laila Jasa
  Omar Ali Saifuddin Medal (POAS)
  Sultan Hassanal Bolkiah Medal (PHBS)
  Armed Forces Service Medal (PBLI)
  Meritorious Service Medal (PJK)
  Long Service Medal (PKL)

References 

20th-century births
2012 deaths

Year of birth uncertain
Speakers of Legislative Council of Brunei